Donald Anthony Martin (born December 24, 1940), also known as Tony Martin, is an American set theorist and philosopher of mathematics at UCLA, where he is an emeritus professor of mathematics and philosophy.

Education and career

Martin received his B.S. from the Massachusetts Institute of Technology in 1962 and was a Junior Fellow of the Harvard Society of Fellows in 1965–67. In 2014, he became a Fellow of the American Mathematical Society.

Philosophical and mathematical work

Among Martin's most notable works are the proofs of analytic determinacy (from the existence of a measurable cardinal), Borel determinacy (from ZFC alone), the proof (with John R. Steel) of projective determinacy (from suitable large cardinal axioms), and his work on Martin's axiom. The Martin measure on Turing degrees is also named after Martin.

See also
 American philosophy
 List of American philosophers

References

External links

List of publications
UCLA Logic center
Personal Website at UCLA

1940 births
Living people
20th-century American mathematicians
21st-century American mathematicians
American logicians
UCLA Philosophy
Philosophers of mathematics
Set theorists
Tarski lecturers
Fellows of the American Mathematical Society
Gödel Lecturers